Taranaki is a region of New Zealand administered by the Taranaki Regional Council.

Taranaki may also refer to:

Place names
 Mount Taranaki (also known as Mount Egmont), a mountain
 Taranaki Province, a province from 1853 to 1876

Other uses
 Port Taranaki, port at New Plymouth, New Zealand
 Taranaki (iwi), a Māori tribe
 Taranaki was a 1957 British nuclear test in Australia

Politics
 Taranaki-King Country, a parliamentary electorate
 Taranaki (New Zealand electorate), a former parliamentary electorate

Sport
 Taranaki Mountainairs, a basketball team
 Taranaki Open, a golf tournament
 Taranaki Rockets, a former rugby league club
 Taranaki Rugby Football Union, a rugby governance body
 Taranaki Rugby League, a rugby league governance body
 Taranaki Stakes, a former horse race
 Taranaki Wildcats, a former rugby league team
 Team Taranaki, a soccer club

Military
 HMNZS Taranaki (F148), a former frigate of the Royal New Zealand Navy